is a railway station in the city of Utsunomiya, Tochigi, Japan, operated by the private railway operator Tobu Railway. The station is numbered "TN-37".

Lines

Station layout
The station consists of one island platform connected to the station building by an underground passageway.

Platforms

Adjacent stations

History
Nishi-Kawada Station opened on 11 August 1931.

From 17 March 2012, station numbering was introduced on all Tobu lines, with Nishi-Kawada Station becoming "TN-37".

Passenger statistics
In fiscal 2019, the station was used by an average of 2410 passengers daily (boarding passengers only).

Surrounding area
Tochigi General Sports Center
 JGSDF Camp Kita-Utsunomiya

See also
 List of railway stations in Japan

References

External links

  

Railway stations in Tochigi Prefecture
Stations of Tobu Railway
Railway stations in Japan opened in 1931
Tobu Utsunomiya Line
Utsunomiya